Steven L. Emanuel is an American attorney who is an author of law school outlines and other law school study aids.

Education and bar admissions
Emanuel is a graduate of Amherst College and Harvard Law School. He was admitted to the bar in the U.S. states of New York, Connecticut, Virginia, Maryland and Massachusetts.

Outline business
Steven Emanuel started writing legal study aids to help fellow J.D. candidates while still a law student at Harvard in 1974.  He tells how he could not understand his civil procedure professor, decided to write up his own outline of the subject, which ran over 100 pages, and eventually stopped going to class.  He gained a solid grasp of the subject by composing the outline, emboldening him to then sell it to his fellow students at a profit that paled in comparison to the effort taken to produce it.  The balance between effort and profit shifted later on as the size of his customer base grew.  Students were drawn by Emanuel's concise style and straightforward outline format.

Steven Emanuel's father, Lazar Emanuel, was himself a lawyer and law school advice author.  Some time after Law School, Steven Emanuel founded Emanuel Publishing Corp.  Under this umbrella organization he merged several series of study aids.  These include CrunchTime, Law in a Flash, and Strategies & Tactics.  His organization also eventually acquired the Siegel's series of law study aids.  In 1995, Emanuel Publishing entered into an exclusive joint venture with Lexis-Nexis to make law outlines available online.  In 1996, he started to create preparatory materials for the Multistate Bar Exam in coordination with the Princeton Review.

One critique, expressed in the Washington Monthly, of the Emanuel Outlines and other similar summary guides is that they may oversimplify legal issues in order to make them more palatable to students and keep down the length of legal guides.  For instance, Emanuel's 2008 Intellectual Property outline (author Margreth Barrett, Hastings law school) gives three pages to international copyright treaties.  A copyright casebook by Gorman and Ginsburg, also intended for students, devotes an equal amount of space to an introduction and history of the subject.  Only then does it launch into a specific description of copyright treaties.  Emanuel contains no discussion of features common among the treaties, showing how being brief does not always clarify the legal matter at hand.

The entirety of Emanuel Publishing Corp. was sold to Aspen Publishing in 2001. Steven Emanuel is still responsible for spearheading all edits and revisions to the Emanuel study aids and is a lecturer in the Wolters Kluwer / Aspen publishing bar review course.

Family
He is married to Marilyn Doreen Mandel Emanuel (since June 1976), and they have five children.

References

External links
 Currently-available Emanuel Products as listed on WKLegaledu websites

Living people
American legal writers
College of William & Mary faculty
Harvard Law School alumni
1950 births